John Chester Culver (August 8, 1932 – December 26, 2018) was an American politician, writer and lawyer who was elected to both the United States House of Representatives (1965–1975) and United States Senate (1975–1981) from Iowa. A member of the Democratic Party, his son Chet Culver served as the 41st Governor of Iowa (2007–2011).

Early life and education
Culver was born in Rochester, Minnesota, the son of Mary C. (Miller) and William C. Culver. He moved as a child with his family to Cedar Rapids, Iowa.

Culver graduated from both Harvard University and Harvard Law School. As an undergraduate, Culver played fullback on the Harvard football team with Edward Kennedy, a future US Senator. He was drafted by the Chicago Cardinals in the 27th round of the 1954 NFL Draft. Rather than try out for professional football after graduating, Culver attended Emmanuel College, Cambridge as the Lionel de Jersey Harvard Scholar.

After his return to the US, he served in the military as a captain in the United States Marine Corps from 1955 to 1958.

In 1978 Culver was inducted into the Harvard Football Hall of Fame.

Career
Culver became active in politics, working as a legislative assistant for Senator Edward Kennedy in 1962. He began his law practice in Iowa a year later. In 1964, he ran against Republican Rep. James E. Bromwell. With President Lyndon Johnson's landslide victory, many Democrats, including Culver, were carried to victory.

In 1974, Culver ran for the U.S. Senate, narrowly defeating Davis Stanley with 50.02% of the vote, for the seat left open by the retirement of Harold E. Hughes. Culver served one term in the Senate, from 1975 until 1981. With Ronald Reagan's national victory as president, Culver was defeated in 1980 by Republican Chuck Grassley. Culver took 45.5% of the vote to Grassley's 53.5%.

In 2000, Culver co-authored American Dreamer, the first comprehensive biography of Henry A. Wallace.

Culver was a featured speaker at the August 28, 2009 memorial service for Senator Edward M. Kennedy, speaking as his Harvard classmate and teammate, his colleague for a time in the Senate, and his longtime friend.

Until January 31, 2011, Culver was the interim director of the Institute of Politics at the John F. Kennedy School of Government at Harvard University. He was succeeded by former Kentucky Secretary of State Trey Grayson. Culver remained on the board of advisers as director emeritus.

Personal life

John Culver and his wife had five children, including Chet, who served as the Governor of Iowa from 2007 to 2011.

At the time of his death, Culver was recently retired at the firm of Arent Fox in Washington, D.C., where he had established the government affairs practice. After leaving the Senate, he had lived and worked in the capital with his wife, Mary Jane Checchi. Culver died on December 26, 2018, in Washington, D.C.

See also

 List of members of the House Un-American Activities Committee

References

Further reading
 Johnson, Marc C. Tuesday Night Massacre: Four Senate Elections and the Radicalization of the Republican Party (U of Oklahoma Press, 2021) 1980 Senate races saw bitter defeats of Frank Church, Birch Bayh, John Culver, and George McGovern and weakened moderates in GOP.

External links

 The John Culver Papers are housed at the University of Iowa Special Collections & University Archives.

|-

|-

1932 births
2018 deaths
Candidates in the 1980 United States presidential election
20th-century American politicians
Democratic Party members of the United States House of Representatives from Iowa
American Presbyterians
Democratic Party United States senators from Iowa
Harvard Crimson football players
Harvard Law School alumni
Iowa lawyers
Lawyers from Washington, D.C.
Military personnel from Minnesota
Politicians from Cedar Rapids, Iowa
Politicians from Rochester, Minnesota
United States Marine Corps officers
Writers from Cedar Rapids, Iowa
Burials at Arlington National Cemetery
20th-century American lawyers
Military personnel from Iowa
Members of Congress who became lobbyists